Kim Jong-won (born 20 November 1975) is a South Korean judoka. He competed in the men's extra-lightweight event at the 1996 Summer Olympics.

References

1975 births
Living people
South Korean male judoka
Olympic judoka of South Korea
Judoka at the 1996 Summer Olympics
Place of birth missing (living people)